Liberty Mariposa Phoenix ( Bottom; July 5, 1976) is a former actress. She is the older sister of Summer Phoenix and the younger sister of River Phoenix, Rain Phoenix, and Joaquin Phoenix.

Early life 
Her mother, Arlyn Sharon (née Dunetz), was born in New York to Jewish parents who emigrated from Russia and Hungary. Her father, John Lee Bottom, was from California and has English, German, and French ancestry.

Career 
Between 1982 and 1986 Phoenix appeared in two TV productions. The two productions were Kate's Secret and Seven Brides for Seven Brothers episode "Christmas Song", after which she stopped acting.

She founded a punk band with her sisters Rain and Summer Phoenix, called The Causey Way, which no longer exists. However, she occasionally supported Rain's band the Papercranes with her backup vocals.

She later taught at the Florida School of Traditional Midwifery.

In 2005, Phoenix designed a line of dresses and skirts, selling them to Some Odd Rubies, a boutique in Manhattan. In March 2007, she opened her own eco-friendly Indigo Green Store in Gainesville, Florida.

Personal life 
Phoenix is married to Andy Lord. She works for the organization River Phoenix Center for Peacebuilding, which was founded by her mother.

Filmography

References

External links 

Living people
1976 births
20th-century American actresses
American people of English descent
American people of Hungarian-Jewish descent
American people of Russian-Jewish descent
American television actresses
People from Caracas
Liberty
21st-century American women